is a near-Earth asteroid of the Apollo group, discovered by the Pan-STARRS 1 survey at Haleakala Observatory, Hawaii on 18 September 2020.

Discovery 
 was discovered by the Pan-STARRS 1 survey at Haleakala Observatory, Hawaii on 18 September 2020. It was first observed in the constellation Triangulum at an apparent magnitude of 22.3.

The asteroid was subsequently listed on the Minor Planet Center's Near-Earth Object Confirmation Page (NEOCP) as P116Atg. Follow-up observations were carried out by the Astronomical Research Observatory  and the asteroid was identified in earlier Mount Lemmon Survey  observations from 28 August and 17 September 2020.

Since discovery,  has been identified in several precovery observations from Pan-STARRS 1 between November 2012 and January 2015 as well as October 2012 observations from the Mount Lemmon Survey. The earliest known precovery observations were identified in three Sloan Digital Sky Survey images from 25 October 2008.

Orbit and classification 

 orbits the Sun at an average distance of 2.52 AU once every 3.99 years. Its orbit has a high eccentricity of 0.64 and an inclination of 14° with respect to the ecliptic plane. Over the course of its orbit, its distance from the Sun ranges from 0.91 AU at perihelion to 4.1 AU at aphelion, crossing the orbits of Earth and Mars. Since its orbit crosses that of Earth's while having a semi-major axis greater than 1 AU,  is classified as an Apollo asteroid.

Physical characteristics

Diameter and albedo 
Based on an magnitude-to-diameter conversion and a measured absolute magnitude of 17.35,  measures between 0.9 and 2.0 kilometers in diameter for an assumed geometric albedo of 0.25 and 0.05, respectively.

References

External links 
 "Pseudo-MPEC" for P116Atg, Project Pluto, 19 September 2020
 
 
 

Minor planet object articles (unnumbered)

20200918
20200918